Sparganium  fluctuans is a species of bur-reed found in North America known by the common name floating bur-reed. It is listed as endangered in Connecticut.

References

Flora of North America
fluctans
Plants described in 1905